Coleophora aegra is a moth of the family Coleophoridae. It is found in northern Pakistan (Abbottabad and Murree) and Afghanistan (Nuristan).

The wingspan is 10–11 mm. The head is glossy grey, while the sides of the crown are whitish. The palpi are smooth and grey and the antennae are simple, white, although ringed above with grey. The thorax and abdomen are dark grey. The forewings and hindwings are dark grey.

References

aegra
Moths described in 1917
Moths of Asia